Clive Ronald Burr (8 March 1957 – 12 March 2013) was an English drummer.  He was a member of the heavy metal band Iron Maiden from 1979 to 1982.

Career
Previously a member of Samson, Burr joined Iron Maiden in 1979. Auditioning and joining upon the recommendation of then-Iron Maiden guitarist Dennis Stratton, Burr played on their first three records: Iron Maiden, Killers and their breakthrough release The Number of the Beast, the last of which was the Maiden debut of Bruce Dickinson. Burr was fired from the band in 1982 during The Beast on the Road tour. He was replaced by the band's current drummer, Nicko McBrain. Burr co-wrote one song on The Number of the Beast, "Gangland", and another song, "Total Eclipse", that was cut from the album and showed up as the B-side of the "Run to the Hills" single, and later on the Number of the Beast remastered CD re-release. Burr also appeared on "The Number of the Beast", "Run to the Hills" and "Women in Uniform" (a cover of the Australian band Skyhooks).

In an interview with Classic Rock in February 2011, Burr candidly discussed his split from Maiden. Describing much of what has been written about the split as "hogwash", Burr indicated that he was ousted from the band after taking a break to mourn the recent death of his father, rebutting claims that his departure was due to overindulgence. Bruce Dickinson's 2017 autobiography suggests Burr was ousted due to personality conflicts with Steve Harris which led to the two arguing and acting out during performances.

After "leaving" Iron Maiden, Burr briefly played in the French group Trust, thus switching places with McBrain, and briefly with the American band Alcatrazz. Burr was featured in the short-lived NWOBHM supergroup Gogmagog which also included ex-Iron Maiden vocalist Paul Di'Anno and future Maiden guitarist Janick Gers, ex Whitesnake bassist Neil Murray and ex Def Leppard guitarist Pete Willis. He also had a band known as Clive Burr's Escape (later known as Stratus), featuring former Praying Mantis members, which disbanded after releasing one album. Burr then joined Dee Snider in his post-Twisted Sister outfit Desperado, which was never fully realized due to a falling out with the band's record company. Burr performed with British bands Elixir and Praying Mantis in the 1990s and appears on the Praying Mantis 1996 live album "Captured Alive in Tokyo City", but did not become a full member of either.

Burr's signature white drum kit was donated to the Hard Rock Cafe in London in 2005.

Illness
Burr was diagnosed with multiple sclerosis in the late 1990s, the treatment of which left him deeply in debt. Iron Maiden staged a series of charity concerts and were involved in the founding of the Clive Burr MS Trust Fund. Burr used a wheelchair due to his condition.

He was also the patron of Clive Aid, a charity formed in 2004. Clive Aid has continued to raise awareness and funds for various cancer and multiple sclerosis programs around the world through the staging of rock events. Burr attended many of these events. His partner Mimi was also diagnosed with MS.

Death
Burr died in his sleep on 12 March 2013 in London, four days after his 56th birthday, due to complications related to MS.

In a statement released on the band's website Iron Maiden bass player Steve Harris stated "This is terribly sad news. Clive was a very old friend of all of us. He was a wonderful person and an amazing drummer who made a valuable contribution to Maiden in the early days when we were starting out. This is a sad day for everyone in the band and those around him and our thoughts and condolences are with his partner Mimi and family at this time."

Iron Maiden singer Bruce Dickinson stated "Even during the darkest days of his M.S., Clive never lost his sense of humour or irreverence."

A funeral service was held for Burr on 25 March 2013 in London.

Legacy 
Burr's style was influential on many heavy metal drummers. Dave Lombardo, known for his work with bands such as Slayer, Grip Inc., Fantômas and Suicidal Tendencies, stated that "his style was inspiring and the albums he recorded with Iron Maiden are touchstones of my music education". Charlie Benante of Anthrax said: "the drumming on ’Killers’ inspired me to kick it up a notch and I did." According to Dave McClain, former drummer for Machine Head, who considers Burr a huge influence, he "brought punk rock drumming into heavy metal".

Other drummers like Paul Bostaph (Slayer, Exodus, Testament), Stefan Schwarzmann (Helloween, Krokus), Chris Reifert (Death, Autopsy), Steve Asheim (Deicide), Jan Axel Blomberg (Mayhem), Jason Bittner (Shadows Fall) and Richard Christy (Iced Earth, Death, Charred Walls of the Damned) also cited Burr as an influence.

Jeff Waters, guitarist and leader of Annihilator, regards his drumming as an inspiration on the drum parts he writes for his band.

Iron Maiden lead singer Bruce Dickinson considered him to be "...the best drummer the band ever had. That's not taking anything away from [present drummer] Nicko. Technically, Nicko's probably a far more competent drummer than Clive. It's just that Clive had this incredible feel, and you can't learn that, and I regret that he wasn't given more time to try and sort himself out." Iron Maiden guitarist Adrian Smith also praised his drumming ability. "Clive was a great drummer, an Ian Paice-type drummer, steady and solid with a nice feel to everything."

Discography

With Samson
 "Telephone" (single)
 "Mr Rock and Roll" (single)

With Iron Maiden
Iron Maiden (1980)
Live!! +one (1980)
Killers (1981)
Live at the Rainbow (1981)
Maiden Japan (1981)
The Number of the Beast (1982)
Video Pieces (1983)
12 Wasted Years (1987)
The First Ten Years (From There to Eternity) (1990)
Best of the Beast (1996)
Ed Hunter (1999)
Classic Albums: Iron Maiden – The Number of the Beast (2001)
BBC Archives (2002)
Beast over Hammersmith (2002)
Best of the 'B' Sides (2002)
Edward the Great (2002)
The History of Iron Maiden – Part 1: The Early Days (2004)
The Essential Iron Maiden (2005)
Somewhere Back in Time (2008)

With Trust
 Trust IV (1983)
 Man's Trap (1984)
 The Best of (1997)

With Stratus
 Throwing Shapes (1984)

With Gogmagog
 I Will Be There (EP; 1985)

With Elixir
 Lethal potion (1990)
 Sovereign Remedy (2004)

With Desperado
 Bloodied But Unbowed (1996, recorded in 1988)

With Praying Mantis
 Captured Alive in Tokyo City (1996)
 Demorabilia (1999) (compilation, contains demos of Clive Burr's Escape)

References

External links

1957 births
2013 deaths
20th-century English musicians
21st-century English musicians
Deaths from multiple sclerosis
English heavy metal drummers
English people with disabilities
English rock drummers
Gogmagog (band) members
Iron Maiden members
People from East Ham
Neurological disease deaths in England
Trust (French band) members
Samson (band) members
Alcatrazz members